Rafael Martínez Carpena, known as Rafa Blas (born 8 November 1986, in Albacete), is a Spanish rock and heavy metal-singer, mostly known as the winner of Spanish talent show La Voz in 2012. Before being a part of La Voz, he was the lead singer of melodic heavy metal band Matavys (2005–2010) and Toledo-based power metal-band Nocturnia (2010–2013).

After winning La Voz, Rafa begun his solo career as Rafa Blas and released his debut album Mi Voz in 2013 via Universal Music. Two years later, he released his second solo album Sin Mirar Atrás. This time via Maldito Records.

Discography

Matavys
 Demo (Independent) - 2007
 Tu Destino (Molusco Producciones) - 2009

Nocturnia
 Sin Retorno (Independent) - 2012

Solo

Studio albums
 Mi Voz (Universal Music) - 2013
 Sin Mirar Atrás (Maldito Records) - 2015

Singles
 "Hijo De La Luna" - 2013
 "Vivir Morir" - 2013
 "Sigo Aquí" - 2013
 "Sin Ti No Soy Nada" - 2014
 "Hoy Tengo Ganas De Ti" - 2015
 "Soy Yo" - 2015
 "Últimas Cartas" - 2017
 "Eloise" - 2017
 "It's Your Time" - 2017
 "You're My Heart, You're My Soul" - 2018
 "We Are The Ones" - 2019
 "Fire In My Heart" - 2019
 "Alive" - 2021

References

External links
 Official website

1986 births
Living people
Spanish guitarists
Spanish composers
Spanish male composers
Spanish rock singers
Heavy metal singers
Rock en Español musicians
21st-century Spanish singers
21st-century guitarists
21st-century Spanish male singers
Spanish male guitarists